Luljeta Hoxha is an Albanian actress and director. After finished high school "Asim Vokshi" for foreign languages in English branch, in Tirana city, pursued her studies at the University of Arts of Albania, Faculty of Performing Arts, Theatre Director branch, major director.

Theater 
Luljeta Hoxha has staged essential theater plays of important authors in worldwide dramaturgy. In addition she is an active director in various cultural and artistic activities.   
 The Fall of the House of Usher by Edgar Allan Poe at the National Theatre of Albania (director)
 Miss Julie by August Strindberg with a new artistic point of view at National Theatre of Albania
 The Crucible by Arthur Miller at the National Theatre of Albania (assistant director) 
 Doruntine by Ismail Kadare at Aleksandër Moisiu Theatre(actress).
 Miss Julie by August Strindberg in the Central Stage of the University of Arts of Albania 
 Rose scarlatte by Aldo De Benedetti at the National Theatre of Albania (actress) 
 Good and sexy by Woody Allen in the Black Box Theater of the University of Arts of Albania
 The first and the last by John Galsworthy at the Black Box Theater of the University of Arts of Albania
 Fear and Misery of the Third Reich - The Jewish wife by Bertolt Brecht at the Black Box Theater of the University of Arts of Albania
 The Lying Kind by Anthony Neilson at Aleksandër Moisiu Theatre
 The flames of the soul by Odise Plaku at Aleksandër Moisiu Theatre
 Sofra Tiranase from Tirana Cultural Association at Palace of Congresses (assistant director)

Filmography
 Stage Lights short film by Lorin Terezi

References

Living people
Albanian actresses
Albanian film directors
Albanian women film directors
Year of birth missing (living people)